Willy Adolf Theodor Ramme (28 February 1887 – 24 August 1953) was a German entomologist.
Ramme was born in Berlin and was a Curator in the Berlin's Natural History Museum. He specialised  in Orthoptera.

Works
Partial list
1921 Orthopterologische Beiträge. Archiv für Naturgeschichte Abt. A, 86(12): 81-166.
1928 Orthoptera palaearctica critica. V. Ein neues Genus der Euprepocnemini (Acrid.). Eos , Madrid, 4 : 113-116, 1 fig., pl. 2.
1929 Afrikanische Acrididae. Revisionen und Beschreibungen wenig bekannter und neuer Gattungen und Arten. Mitteilungen aus dem zoologischen Museum in Berlin, 15 : 247-492, pl. 2 à 16.
1930 Ein neuer Anthermus von Tanganyika ( Orth. Acrid.). Mitteilungen aus dem zoologischen Museum in Berlin, 16 (4) : 671-672, fig.
1931 Ergänzungen und Berichtigungen zu meiner Arbeit "Afrikanische Acrididae" (Orth.). Mitteilungen aus dem zoologischen Museum in Berlin, 16 (6) : 918-945.
1931 Beiträge zur Kenntnis der palaearktischen Orthopterenfauna (Tettig. et Acrid.). Mitteilungen aus dem Zoologischen Museum in Berlin 17: 165-200.
1941 Die Orthopterenfauna von Kärnten. Carinthia II 131./51.: 121–131.
1951 Zur Systematik, Faunistik und Biologie der Orthopteren von Südosteuropa und Vorderasien. Mitteilungen Zoolog. Museum Berlin 27, 431 pp + Tafeln.

References
Deckert, J. 1999: [Ramme, W. A. T.]  Heteropteron, Köln 6: 16
Natvig, L. R. 1953?: [Ramme, W. A. T.]  Norsk ent. Tidsskr., Oslo 9: 265
Sachtleben, H. 1953: [Ramme, W. A. T.]  Beitr. Ent. 3:  697
Strouhal, H. 1955: [Ramme, W. A. T.]  Ann. Naturhist. Mus. Wien, Wien 60:11

German entomologists
Scientists from Berlin
1887 births
1953 deaths
20th-century German zoologists